San Francesco di Paola is a Roman Catholic parish church located on via Conte Alaimo, 116, in the town of Lentini, province of Syracuse, Sicily, Italy.

History and description

The present church was rebuilt after the 1693 Sicily earthquake and completed in 1762.  Awkwardly placed at a corner, the church is accessed by scenic broad stairs. The facade is simple. At the west flank is the single bell tower. In the superior tympanum above the portal is a half bust of the titular saint with his staff. The interiors display a sober neoclassical style with some stucco decoration.

References

18th-century Roman Catholic church buildings in Italy